What You Leave Behind is the third studio album by the American country music band Ricochet. It was released in 2000 on Columbia Records.

The album, originally titled What a Ride, was to have been released in 1998, and although three singles from the original album ("Honky Tonk Baby", "Can't Stop Thinkin' 'bout That" and a cover of Steve Young's "Seven Bridges Road") were all released from the original album, all three failed to make Top 40. "Honky Tonk Baby" and "Can't Stop Thinkin' 'Bout That" did not make the final cut, although "You Beat All I've Ever Seen", the final track on this album, is the B-side of "Can't Stop Thinkin' 'Bout That". "Do I Love You Enough" was released in 2000, peaking at #45 on the US country charts, followed by "She's Gone", the band's last chart single, at #48. In between "Seven Bridges Road" and "Do I Love You Enough", drummer Jeff Bryant and steel guitarist Teddy Carr both left the band as well. Also covered on the album is "Why You Been Gone So Long", previously a hit in 1969 for Johnny Darrell.

Track listing
"She's Gone" (Michael Dulaney, Jeffrey Steele, John Hobbs) – 3:10
"Do I Love You Enough" (Richard Fagan, Lisa Palas) – 2:59
"What You Leave Behind" (Dulaney, Neil Thrasher, Heath Wright) – 3:32
"I Can't Believe You Let Her Go" (Stephony Smith, Craig Wiseman) – 3:27
"Baby Hold On" (Eddie Kilgallon, Deryl Dodd) – 3:40
"Seven Bridges Road" (Steve Young) – 3:06
"Why You Been Gone So Long" (Mickey Newbury) – 3:00
"Fall of the Year" (Tom Paden, Lenny Wallace) – 3:10
"Love Is a Serious Thing" (Thrasher, Jack Sundrud) – 3:24
"You Beat All I've Ever Seen" (Steve Bogard, Greg Cook, Jeff Stevens) – 3:39

Musicians
 Richard "Spady" Brannon - bass guitar
 Dennis Burnside - keyboards
 Eric Darken - percussion
 Larry Franklin - fiddle
 Paul Leim - drums
 B. James Lowry - acoustic guitar
 Jerry McPherson - electric guitar
 Greg Morrow - drums
 Jimmy Nichols - keyboards
 Billy Panda - acoustic guitar
 Michael Rhodes - bass guitar
 Tom Roady - percussion
 Brent Rowan - electric guitar
 Bruce Bouton - steel guitar
 Paul Franklin - steel guitar

Chart performance

References

2000 albums
Columbia Records albums
Ricochet (band) albums
Albums produced by Blake Chancey
Albums produced by David Malloy